The following lists events that happened during 1903 in South Africa.

Incumbents

Cape Colony
 Governor of the Cape of Good Hope:Walter Hely-Hutchinson.
 Prime Minister of the Cape of Good Hope: John Gordon Sprigg.

Natal
 Governor of the Colony of Natal: Henry Edward McCallum.
 Prime Minister of the Colony of Natal: Albert Henry Hime (until 17 August), George Morris Sutton (starting 17 August).

Orange River Colony
 Governor of the Orange River Colony and High Commissioner for Southern Africa: Alfred Milner, 1st Viscount Milner.
 Lieutenant-Governor of the Orange River Colony: Hamilton Goold-Adams.

Transvaal
 Governor of the Transvaal and High Commissioner for Southern Africa: Alfred Milner, 1st Viscount Milner.
 Lieutenant-Governor of the Transvaal: Arthur Lawley.

Events

February
 Mahatma Gandhi enrolls to the Bar of the Transvaal Supreme Court.

March
 12 – Andries Dreyer, an archivist of the Dutch Reformed Church, is ordained as a missionary of the congregation for the Hanover Street area in Cape Town.

May
 21 – The first contingent of Chinese labourers leave China to work on the Witwatersrand gold mines.

June
 4 – The Indian Opinion is started by Mahatma Gandhi with Mansukhlal Nazar as editor.

Unknown date
 The County of Pembroke, a British cargo ship, is shipwrecked near Port Elizabeth.

Births
 11 January – Alan Paton, author and founder of the Liberal Party of South Africa, is born in Pietermaritzburg, Natal.
 21 March – J. B. Marks, political activist and trade unionist, is born in Ventersdorp. (d. 1972)
 4 May – Louise Behrens, novelist and Afrikaans journalist, is born in the Orange River Colony.
 4 May – Hendrik Susan, orchestra leader and violist.
 19 June – Wally Hammond, English first-class cricketer and South African sports administrator. (d. 1965)
 8 October – Mikro (Pseudonym for C.H. Kühn), writer and poet, is born at Van Reenens Farm in the Williston district.

Deaths
 21 February – Kate Vaughan, British dancer and actress (born 1852)
 13 March – General David Johannes Joubert (Ou Kat), a South African explorer to East Africa, dies of malaria near Dar es Salaam, Tanzania.
 8 August – Adolf Schiel, German-born officer in Boer armed forces. (b. 1858)

Railways

Railway lines opened
 19 February – Cape Central – Swellendam to Riversdale, .
 28 February – Cape Western – Kalbaskraal to Hopefield (Narrow gauge), .
 22 March – Free State – Sannaspos to Thaba 'Nchu, .
 1 April – Free State – Harrismith to Aberfeldy, .
 27 April – Transvaal – India Junction to Driehoek (avoiding line), .
 17 September – Natal – Mhlatuze to Somkele, .
 1 November – Transvaal – India Junction to New Canada, .
 12 November – Natal – Talana to Lucas Meyer, .
 14 December – Cape Eastern – King William's Town to Middledrift, .
 14 December – Cape Midland – Cookhouse to Adelaide, .
 14 December – Cape Midland – Willowmore to Le Roux, .

Locomotives
Cape
 Nine new Cape gauge and two narrow gauge locomotive types enter service on the Cape Government Railways (CGR):
 The last eight 3rd Class Wynberg Tender suburban locomotives in Cape Town.
 Two Karoo Class  Pacific passenger locomotives. In 1912 they will be designated Class 5A on the South African Railways (SAR).
 Two 6th Class 2-6-2 Prairie locomotives. In 1912 they will be designated Class 6Y on the SAR.
 A second batch of 38 8th Class  Mastodon type locomotives, six on the Western, twenty on the Midland and twelve on the Eastern Systems. In 1912 they will be designated Class 8D on the SAR.
 Four additional 8th Class  Mastodon type locomotives, built to modified specifications in order to accommodate a larger grate area. In 1912 they will be designated Class 8E on the SAR.
 Four Cape 8th Class 2-8-0 Consolidation type locomotives. In 1912 they will be designated Class 8Y on the SAR.
 Two 9th Class  Mikado steam locomotives. In 1912 they will be classified Class Experimental 4 on the SAR.
 A single experimental  Consolidation type tandem compound steam locomotive. In 1912 it will be classified as Class Experimental 3 on the SAR.
 A single experimental  Kitson-Meyer type articulated steam locomotive on the Eastern System.
 A single small Krauss  side-tank locomotive, for use as construction engine on the narrow gauge Avontuur branch.
 A single Krauss 0-6-0 tank locomotive, also for use as construction engine on the Avontuur branch.
 Two locomotives, later named Thebus and Stormberg, enter service with the Irrigation Department of the Public Works Department of the Cape Colony.

Transvaal
 Three new Cape gauge locomotive types enter service on the Central South African Railways (CSAR):
 Six Reid Tenwheeler 4-10-2 tank locomotives are converted to a  configuration. In 1912 they will be designated Class H1 on the SAR.
 Thirty Class 8-L2  Mastodon type locomotives. In 1912 they will be designated Class 8B on the SAR.
 Thirty Class 8-L3 4-8-0 Mastodon type locomotives. In 1912 they will be designated Class 8C on the SAR.

References

 
South Africa
Years in South Africa